This is a list of books about the energy industry:

See also
Benjamin K. Sovacool's bibliography
Energy Matters
List of books about coal mining
List of books about nuclear issues
List of books about renewable energy
List of books by Amory Lovins
List of energy topics
List of environmental books
List of films about nuclear issues
List of films about renewable energy
Peak oil#Books

 
Books

Lists of technical books
 Books
Energy books